Amharic ( or ;) is an Ethiopian Semitic language, which is a subgrouping within the Semitic branch of the Afroasiatic languages. It is spoken as a first language by the Amharas, and also serves as a lingua franca for all other populations residing in major cities and towns of Ethiopia.

The language serves as the official working language of the Ethiopian federal government, and is also the official or working language of several of Ethiopia's federal regions. It has over 32,400,000 mother-tongue speakers and more than 25,100,000 second language speakers making the total number of speakers over 57,500,000. Amharic is the most widely spoken language in Ethiopia, and the second most spoken mother-tongue in Ethiopia (after Oromo). Amharic is also the second largest Semitic language in the world (after Arabic).

Amharic is written left-to-right using a system that grew out of the Geʽez script. The segmental writing system in which consonant-vowel sequences are written as units is called an abugida. The graphemes are called fidäl, which means "script", "alphabet", "letter", or "character".

There is no universally agreed-upon Romanization of Amharic into Latin script. The Amharic examples in the sections below use one system that is common among linguists specialising in Ethiopian Semitic languages.

Background 
Amharic has been the official working language of Ethiopia, language of the courts, the language of trade and everyday communications and of the military since the late 12th century. The Amhara nobles supported the Zagwe prince Lalibela in his power struggle against his brothers which led him to make Amharic Lessana Negus as well as fill the Amhara nobles in the top positions of his Kingdom.  While the appellation of "language of the king" ( "Lisane Negus")/( "Ye-Negus QwanQwa") and its use in the royal court are otherwise traced to the Amhara Emperor Yekuno Amlak. It is one of the official languages of Ethiopia, together with Oromo, Somali, Afar, and Tigrinya. Amharic is an Afro-Asiatic language of the Southwest Semitic group and is related to Geʽez, or Ethiopic, the liturgical language of the Ethiopian Orthodox church; Amharic is written in a slightly modified form of the alphabet used for writing the Geʽez language. There are 33 basic characters, each of which has seven forms depending on which vowel is to be pronounced in the syllable. Until 2020 Amharic was the sole official language of Ethiopia. The 2007 census reported that Amharic was spoken by 21.6 million native speakers in Ethiopia. More recent sources state the number of first-language speakers in 2018 as nearly 32 million, with another 25 million second-language speakers in Ethiopia. Additionally, 3 million emigrants outside of Ethiopia speak the language. Most of the Ethiopian Jewish communities in Ethiopia and Israel speak Amharic. In Washington DC, Amharic became one of the six non-English languages in the Language Access Act of 2004, which allows government services and education in Amharic. Furthermore, Amharic is considered a holy language by the Rastafari religion and is widely used among its followers worldwide.

Linguistic development theory 
 
According to Donald Levine, the Afro-Asiatic language family likely arose either in the eastern Sahara or in southwestern Ethiopia. Early Afro-Asiatic populations speaking proto-Semitic, proto-Cushitic and proto-Omotic languages would have diverged by the fourth or fifth millennium BC. Shortly afterwards, the proto-Cushitic and proto-Omotic groups would have settled in the Ethiopian highlands, with the proto-Semitic speakers crossing the Sinai Peninsula into Asia Minor. A later return movement of peoples from South Arabia would have introduced the Semitic languages to Ethiopia. Based on archaeological evidence, the presence of Semitic speakers in the territory date to some time before 500 BC. Linguistic analysis suggests the presence of Semitic languages in Ethiopia as early as 2000 BC. Levine indicates that by the end of that millennium, the core inhabitants of Greater Ethiopia would have consisted of swarthy Caucasoid ("Afro-Mediterranean") agropastoralists speaking Afro-Asiatic languages of the Semitic, Cushitic and Omotic branches.

Other scholars such as Messay Kebede and Daniel E. Alemu argue that migration across the Red Sea was defined by reciprocal exchange, if it even occurred at all, and that Ethio-Semitic-speaking ethnic groups should not be characterized as foreign invaders.

Amharic is a South Ethio-Semitic language, along with Gurage, Argobba, and others. Some time before the 1st century AD, the North and South branches of Ethio-Semitic diverged. Due to the social stratification of the time, the Cushitic Agaw adopted the South Ethio-Semitic language and eventually absorbed the Semitic population. Amharic thus developed with a Cushitic substratum and a Semitic superstratum. The northernmost South Ethio-Semitic speakers, or the proto-Amhara, remained in constant contact with their North Ethio-Semitic neighbors, evidenced by linguistic analysis and oral traditions. A 7th century southward shift of the center of gravity of the Kingdom of Aksum and the ensuing integration and Christianization of the proto-Amhara also resulted in a high prevalence of Geʽez sourced lexicon in Amharic. Some time after the 9th century AD, Amharic diverged from its closest relative, Argobba, probably due to religious differences as the Argobba adopted Islam.

In 1983, Lionel Bender proposed that Amharic may have been constructed as a pidgin as early as the 4th century AD to enable communication between Aksumite soldiers speaking Semitic, Cushitic, and Omotic languages, but this hypothesis has not garnered widespread acceptance. The preservation in Old Amharic of VSO word order and gutturals typical of Semitic languages, Cushitic influences shared with other Ethio-Semitic languages (especially those of the Southern branch), and the number of geographically distinct Cushitic languages that have influenced Amharic at different points in time (e.g. Oromo influence beginning in the 16th century) support a natural evolution of Amharic from a Proto-Ethio-Semitic language with considerable Cushitic influences (similar to Gurage, Tigrinya, etc.).

Phonology 

The Amharic ejective consonants correspond to the Proto-Semitic "emphatic consonants." In the Ethiopianist tradition they are often transcribed with a dot below the letter. 

The notation of central vowels in the Ethiopianist tradition is shown in angled brackets.

Allophones 
The voiced bilabial plosive /b/ is phonetically realized as a voiced labial approximant /β̞/ medially between sonorants in non-geminated form. The affricate ejective // is also heard as a fricative ejective [], but is mostly heard as the affricate sound []. The rhotic consonant is realized as a trill when geminated and a tap otherwise. The closed central unrounded vowel (Romanized "ə" | IPA /ɨ/) and mid-central vowel (Romanized "ä" | IPA /ə/) are generally fronted to [ɪ] and [ɛ], respectively, following palatal consonants, and generally retracted and rounded to [ʊ] and [ɔ], respectively, following labialized velar consonants.

Examples

Writing system

The Amharic script is an abugida, and the graphemes of the Amharic writing system are called . It is derived from a modification of the Ge'ez script. Each character represents a consonant+vowel sequence, but the basic shape of each character is determined by the consonant, which is modified for the vowel. This is because these fidäl originally represented distinct sounds, but phonological changes merged them. The citation form for each series is the consonant+ä form, i.e. the first column of the fidäl. The Amharic script is included in Unicode, and glyphs are included in fonts available with major operating systems.

Alphasyllabary

Gemination
As in most other Ethiopian Semitic languages, gemination is contrastive in Amharic.  That is, consonant length can distinguish words from one another; for example,  'he said',  'there is';  'he hits',  'he will be hit'.  Gemination is not indicated in Amharic orthography, but Amharic readers typically do not find this to be a problem.  This property of the writing system is analogous to the vowels of Arabic and Hebrew or the tones of many Bantu languages, which are not normally indicated in writing. Ethiopian novelist Haddis Alemayehu, who was an advocate of Amharic orthography reform, indicated gemination in his novel Love to the Grave by placing a dot above the characters whose consonants were geminated, but this practice is rare.

Punctuation 
Punctuation includes the following:

 section mark
 word separator
 full stop (period)
 comma
 semicolon
 colon
 preface colon (introduces speech from a descriptive prefix)
 question mark
 paragraph separator

Grammar

Simple Amharic sentences

One may construct simple Amharic sentences by using a subject and a predicate. Here are a few simple sentences:

Pronouns

Personal pronouns 
Amharic grammar distinguishes person, number, and often gender. This includes personal pronouns such as English I, Amharic  ; English she, Amharic  . As in other Semitic languages, the same distinctions appear in three other places in their grammar.

 Subject–verb agreement
All Amharic verbs agree with their subjects; that is, the person, number, and (in the second- and third-person singular) gender of the subject of the verb are marked by suffixes or prefixes on the verb. Because the affixes that signal subject agreement vary greatly with the particular verb tense/aspect/mood, they are normally not considered to be pronouns and are discussed elsewhere in this article under verb conjugation.
 Object pronoun suffixes
Amharic verbs often have additional morphology that indicates the person, number, and (second- and third-person singular) gender of the object of the verb.

While morphemes such as -at in this example are sometimes described as signaling object agreement, analogous to subject agreement, they are more often thought of as object pronoun suffixes because, unlike the markers of subject agreement, they do not vary significantly with the tense/aspect/mood of the verb.  For arguments of the verb other than the subject or the object, there are two separate sets of related suffixes, one with a benefactive meaning (to, for), the other with an adversative or locative meaning (against, to the detriment of, on, at).

Morphemes such as -llat and -bbat in these examples will be referred to in this article as prepositional object pronoun suffixes because they correspond to prepositional phrases such as for her and on her, to distinguish them from the direct object pronoun suffixes such as -at 'her'.
Possessive suffixes
Amharic has a further set of morphemes that are suffixed to nouns, signalling possession:  bet 'house',  bete, my house, ; betwa, her house.

In each of these four aspects of the grammar, independent pronouns, subject–verb agreement, object pronoun suffixes, and possessive suffixes, Amharic distinguishes eight combinations of person, number, and gender. For first person, there is a two-way distinction between singular (I) and plural (we), whereas for second and third persons, there is a distinction between singular and plural and within the singular a further distinction between masculine and feminine (you m. sg., you f. sg., you pl., he, she, they).

Amharic is a pro-drop language: neutral sentences in which no element is emphasized normally omit independent pronouns:   'he's Ethiopian',   'I invited her'.  The Amharic words that translate he, I, and her do not appear in these sentences as independent words. However, in such cases, the person, number, and (second- or third-person singular) gender of the subject and object are marked on the verb.  When the subject or object in such sentences is emphasized, an independent pronoun is used:   'he's Ethiopian',   'I invited her',   'I invited her'.

The table below shows alternatives for many of the forms.
The choice depends on what precedes the form in question, usually whether this is a vowel or a consonant, for example, for the first-person singular possessive suffix,   'my country',   'my body'.

Within second- and third-person singular, there are two additional polite independent pronouns, for reference to people to whom the speaker wishes to show respect. This usage is an example of the so-called T–V distinction that is made in many languages. The polite pronouns in Amharic are  ǝrswo 'you (sg. polite)'. and  ǝssaččäw  's/he (polite)'.  Although these forms are singular semantically—they refer to one person—they correspond to third-person plural elsewhere in the grammar, as is common in other T–V systems.  For the possessive pronouns, however, the polite 2nd person has the special suffix -wo 'your sg. pol.'

For possessive pronouns (mine, yours, etc.), Amharic adds the independent pronouns to the preposition  'of':   'mine',   'yours m. sg.',   'yours f. sg.',   'hers', etc.

Reflexive pronouns
For reflexive pronouns ('myself', 'yourself', etc.), Amharic adds the possessive suffixes to the noun  ras 'head':  rase 'myself',  raswa 'herself', etc.

Demonstrative pronouns
Like English, Amharic makes a two-way distinction between near ('this, these') and far ('that, those') demonstrative expressions (pronouns, adjectives, adverbs).  Besides number, Amharic - unlike English - also distinguishes between the masculine and the feminine genders in the singular.

There are also separate demonstratives for formal reference, comparable to the formal personal pronouns:  ǝññih 'this, these (formal)' and  ǝnniya 'that, those (formal)'.

The singular pronouns have combining forms beginning with zz instead of y when they follow a preposition:  sǝläzzih 'because of this; therefore',  ǝndäzziya 'like that'.  Note that the plural demonstratives, like the second and third person plural personal pronouns, are formed by adding the plural prefix  ǝnnä- to the singular masculine forms.

Nouns
Amharic nouns can be primary or derived. A noun like  'foot, leg' is primary, and a noun like  'pedestrian' is a derived noun.

Gender
Amharic nouns can have a masculine or feminine gender. There are several ways to express gender. An example is the old suffix -t for femininity. This suffix is no longer productive and is limited to certain patterns and some isolated nouns. Nouns and adjectives ending in -awi usually take the suffix -t to form the feminine form, e.g. ityop̣p̣ya-(a)wi 'Ethiopian (m.)' vs. ityop̣p̣ya-wi-t 'Ethiopian (f.)'; sämay-awi 'heavenly (m.)' vs. sämay-awi-t 'heavenly (f.)'. This suffix also occurs in nouns and adjective based on the pattern , e.g.  'king' vs.  'queen' and  'holy (m.)' vs.  'holy (f.)'.

Some nouns and adjectives take a feminine marker -it:  'child, boy' vs.  'girl'; bäg 'sheep, ram' vs. bäg-it 'ewe';  'senior, elder (m.)' vs.  'old woman'; ṭoṭa 'monkey' vs. ṭoṭ-it 'monkey (f.)'. Some nouns have this feminine marker without having a masculine opposite, e.g.  'spider', azur-it 'whirlpool, eddy'. There are, however, also nouns having this -it suffix that are treated as masculine: säraw-it 'army', nägar-it 'big drum'.

The feminine gender is not only used to indicate biological gender, but may also be used to express smallness, e.g. bet-it-u 'the little house' (lit. house-FEM-DEF). The feminine marker can also serve to express tenderness or sympathy.

Specifiers
Amharic has special words that can be used to indicate the gender of people and animals. For people, wänd is used for masculinity and set for femininity, e.g. wänd lǝǧ 'boy', set lǝǧ 'girl'; wänd hakim 'physician, doctor (m.)', set hakim 'physician, doctor (f.)'.

Examples: täbat ṭǝǧǧa 'calf (m.)'; awra doro 'cock (rooster)'; set doro 'hen'.

Plural
The plural suffix  is used to express plurality of nouns. Some morphophonological alternations occur depending on the final consonant or vowel. For nouns ending in a consonant, plain  is used: bet 'house' becomes  'houses'. For nouns ending in a back vowel (-a, -o, -u), the suffix takes the form , e.g. 'dog',  'dogs'; käbäro 'drum',  'drums'. 'scholar',  or  'scholars'. Another possibility for nouns ending in a vowel is to delete the vowel and use plain , as in  'dogs'.

Besides using the normal external plural (-očč), nouns and adjectives can be pluralized by way of reduplicating one of the radicals. For example, wäyzäro 'lady' can take the normal plural, yielding , but  'ladies' is also found (Leslau 1995:173).

Some kinship-terms have two plural forms with a slightly different meaning. For example,  'brother' can be pluralized as  'brothers' but also as  'brothers of each other'.

In compound words, the plural marker is suffixed to the second noun:  'church' (lit. house of Christian) becomes  'churches'.

Archaic forms
Amsalu Aklilu has pointed out that Amharic has inherited a large number of old plural forms directly from Classical Ethiopic (Ge'ez) (Amharic: gǝ'ǝz) (Leslau 1995:172). There are basically two archaic pluralising strategies, called external and internal plural. The external plural consists of adding the suffix -an (usually masculine) or -at (usually feminine) to the singular form. The internal plural employs vowel quality or apophony to pluralize words, similar to English man vs. men and goose vs. geese. Sometimes combinations of the two systems are found. The archaic plural forms are sometimes used to form new plurals, but this is only considered grammatical in more established cases.

Examples of the external plural:  'teacher', ;  'wise person', ;  'priest', ; qal 'word', .
Examples of the internal plural:  'virgin', ; hagär 'land', .
Examples of combined systems:  'king', ;  'star', ;   'book', .

Definiteness
If a noun is definite or specified, this is expressed by a suffix, the article, which is -u or -w for masculine singular nouns and -wa, -itwa or -ätwa for feminine singular nouns. For example:

In singular forms, this article distinguishes between the male and female gender; in plural forms this distinction is absent, and all definites are marked with -u, e.g. bet-očč-u 'houses', gäräd-očč-u 'maids'. As in the plural, morphophonological alternations occur depending on the final consonant or vowel.

Accusative
Amharic has an accusative marker, -(ə)n.  Its use is related to the definiteness of the object, thus Amharic shows differential object marking.  In general, if the object is definite, possessed, or a proper noun, the accusative must be used, but if the direct object is not determined, the accusative marker is generally not used. (Leslau 1995: pp. 181–182 ff.).

The accusative suffix is usually placed after the first word of the noun phrase:

Nominalisation
Amharic has various ways to derive nouns from other words or other nouns. One way of nominalising consists of a form of vowel agreement (similar vowels on similar places) inside the three-radical structures typical of Semitic languages. For example:
CəCäC: –  'wisdom';  'sickness'
CəCCaC-e: –  'obesity';  'cruelty'
CəCC-ät: –  'moistness';  'knowledge';   'fatness'.
There are also several nominalising suffixes.
: – 'relation';  'Christianity';  'laziness';  'priesthood'.
-e, suffixed to place name X, yields 'a person from X': goǧǧam-e 'someone from Gojjam'.
 and  serve to express profession, or some relationship with the base noun:  'pedestrian' (from  'foot');  'gate-keeper' (from bärr 'gate').
 and  – '-ness';  'Ethiopianness';  'nearness' (from  'near').

Verbs

Conjugation

As in other Semitic languages, Amharic verbs use a combination of prefixes and suffixes to indicate the subject, distinguishing 3 persons, two numbers, and (in all persons except first-person and "honorific" pronouns) two genders.

Gerund
Along with the infinitive and the present participle, the gerund is one of three non-finite verb forms. The infinitive is a nominalized verb, the present participle expresses incomplete action, and the gerund expresses completed action, e.g.  bälto wädä gäbäya hedä 'Ali, having eaten lunch, went to the market'.
There are several usages of the gerund depending on its morpho-syntactic features.

Verbal use
The gerund functions as the head of a subordinate clause (see the example above). There may be more than one gerund in one sentence.
The gerund is used to form the following tense forms:
 present perfect      'He has said'.
 past perfect         'He had said'.
 possible perfect     'He (probably) has said'.

Adverbial use
The gerund can be used as an adverb:
alfo alfo  'Sometimes he laughs'. (From ማለፍ 'to pass')

Adjectives
Adjectives are words or constructions used to qualify nouns. Adjectives in Amharic can be formed in several ways: they can be based on nominal patterns, or derived from nouns, verbs and other parts of speech. Adjectives can be nominalized by way of suffixing the nominal article (see Nouns above). Amharic has few primary adjectives. Some examples are  'kind, generous',  'mute, dumb, silent',  'yellow'.

Nominal patterns
CäCCaC –  'heavy';  'generous'
CäC(C)iC –  'fine, subtle';  'new'
CäC(C)aCa –  'broken';  'bent, wrinkled'
CəC(C)əC –  'intelligent, smart'; '  'hidden'
CəC(C)uC –  'worthy, dignified';  'black';  'holy'

Denominalizing suffixes
-äñña –  'powerful' (from hayl 'power');  'true' (from  'truth')
-täñña –  'secular' (from aläm 'world')
-awi –  'intelligent' (from  'heart');  'earthly' (from  'earth'); haymanot-awi 'religious' (from haymanot 'religion')

Prefix yä
yä-kätäma 'urban' (lit. 'from the city');  'Christian' (lit. 'of Christianity');  'wrong' (lit. 'of falsehood').

Adjective noun complex
The adjective and the noun together are called the 'adjective noun complex'. In Amharic, the adjective precedes the noun, with the verb last; e.g.  'a bad master';  (lit. big house he-built) 'he built a big house'.

If the adjective noun complex is definite, the definite article is suffixed to the adjective and not to the noun, e.g.  (lit. big-def house) 'the big house'. In a possessive construction, the adjective takes the definite article, and the noun takes the pronominal possessive suffix, e.g.  (lit. big-def house-my) "my big house".

When enumerating adjectives using  'and', both adjectives take the definite article:  (lit. pretty-def-and intelligent-def girl came) "the pretty and intelligent girl came". In the case of an indefinite plural adjective noun complex, the noun is plural and the adjective may be used in singular or in plural form.

Dialects
Not much has been published about Amharic dialect differences. All dialects are mutually intelligible, but certain minor variations are noted.

Mittwoch described a form of Amharic spoken by the descendants of Weyto language speakers, but it was likely not a dialect of Amharic so much as the result of incomplete language learning as the community shifted languages from Weyto to Amharic.

Literature

The oldest surviving examples of written Amharic date back to the reigns of the 14th century Emperor of Ethiopia Amda Seyon I and his successors, who commissioned a number of poems known as "የወታደሮች መዝሙር" (Soldier songs) glorifying them and their troops. There is a growing body of literature in Amharic in many genres. This literature includes government proclamations and records, educational books, religious material, novels, poetry, proverb collections, dictionaries (monolingual and bilingual), technical manuals, medical topics, etc. The Bible was first translated into Amharic by Abu Rumi in the early 19th century, but other translations of the Bible into Amharic have been done since.  The most famous Amharic novel is Fiqir Iske Meqabir (transliterated various ways) by Haddis Alemayehu (1909–2003), translated into English by Sisay Ayenew with the title Love unto Crypt, published in 2005.

Rastafari movement
The word Rastafari comes from Ras Täfäri, the pre-regnal title of Haile Selassie, composed of the Amharic words Ras (literally "Head", an Ethiopian title equivalent to duke) and Haile Selassie's pre-regnal name, Tafari.

Many Rastafarians learn Amharic as a second language, as they consider it to be sacred. After Haile Selassie's 1966 visit to Jamaica, study circles in Amharic were organized in Jamaica as part of the ongoing exploration of Pan-African identity and culture. Various reggae artists in the 1970s, including Ras Michael, Lincoln Thompson and Misty in Roots, have sung in Amharic, thus bringing the language to a wider audience. The Abyssinians, a reggae group, have also used Amharic, most notably in the song "Satta Massagana". The title was believed to mean "give thanks"; however, this phrase means "he thanked" or "he praised", as  means "he gave", and  "thanks" or "praise".  The correct way to say "give thanks" in Amharic is one word, misgana. The word "satta" has become a common expression in the Rastafari dialect of English, Iyaric, meaning "to sit down and partake".

Software
Amharic is supported on most major Linux distributions, including Fedora and Ubuntu.

The Amharic script is included in Unicode, in the Ethiopic block (U+1200 – U+137F). Nyala font is included on Windows 7 (see YouTube video) and Vista (Amharic Language Interface Pack) to display and edit using the Amharic Script. In February 2010, Microsoft released its Windows Vista operating system in Amharic, enabling Amharic speakers to use its operating system in their language.

Google added Amharic to its Language Tools which allows typing Amharic Script online without an Amharic Keyboard. Since 2004 Wikipedia has had an Amharic language Wiki that uses Ethiopic script.

See also
Help:IPA/Amharic

References

Citations

Grammar
 Ludolf, Hiob (1698). Grammatica Linguæ Amharicæ. Frankfort.
  [rewritten version of 'A modern grammar of spoken Amharic', 1941]
 
 Afevork Ghevre Jesus (1911). Il verbo amarico. Roma.
 Amsalu Aklilu & Demissie Manahlot (1990). T'iru ye'Amarinnya Dirset 'Indet Yale New! (An Amharic grammar, in Amharic)
 Anbessa Teferra and Grover Hudson (2007). Essentials of Amharic. Cologne: Rüdiger Köppe Verlag.
 Appleyard, David (1994). Colloquial Amharic. Routledge 

 Baye Yimam (2007). Amharic Grammar. Second Edition. Addis Ababa University. Ethiopia.
 Bender, M. Lionel. (1974) "Phoneme frequencies in Amharic".  Journal of Ethiopian Studies 12.1:19–24
 Bender, M. Lionel and Hailu Fulass (1978). Amharic verb morphology.  (Committee on Ethiopian Studies, monograph 7.) East Lansing: African Studies Center, Michigan State University.
 Bennet, M. E. (1978). Stratificational Approaches to Amharic Phonology. PhD thesis, Ann Arbor: Michigan State University.
 Cohen, Marcel (1936). Traité de langue amharique. Paris: Institut d'Ethnographie.
 Cohen, Marcel (1939). Nouvelles études d'éthiopien merdional. Paris: Champion.
 Dawkins, C. H. (¹1960, ²1969). The Fundamentals of Amharic. Addis Ababa.
 Kapeliuk, Olga (1988). Nominalization in Amharic. Stuttgart: F. Steiner Verlag Wiesbaden. 
 Kapeliuk, Olga (1994). Syntax of the noun in Amharic. Wiesbaden: Harrassowitz. .
 Łykowska, Laura (1998). Gramatyka jezyka amharskiego Wydawnictwo Akademickie Dialog. 
 Leslau, Wolf (1995). Reference Grammar of Amharic. Harrassowitz, Wiesbaden.  
 Praetorius, Franz (1879). Die amharische Sprache. Halle: Verlag der Buchhandlung des Waisenhauses.

Dictionaries
 Abbadie, Antoine d' (1881). Dictionnaire de la langue amariñña. Actes de la Société philologique, t. 10. Paris.
 Amsalu Aklilu (1973). English-Amharic dictionary. Oxford University Press.  
 Baeteman, J.-É. (1929). Dictionnaire amarigna-français. Diré-Daoua
 Gankin, É. B. (1969). Amxarsko-russkij slovar'. Pod redaktsiej Kassa Gäbrä Heywät. Moskva: Izdatel'stvo 'Sovetskaja Éntsiklopedija'.
 Guidi, I. (1901). Vocabolario amarico-italiano. Roma.
 
 Guidi, I. (1940). Supplemento al Vocabolario amarico-italiano. (compilato con il concorso di Francesco Gallina ed Enrico Cerulli) Roma.
 Kane, Thomas L. (1990). Amharic–English Dictionary. (2 vols.) Wiesbaden: Otto Harrassowitz.  
 Leslau, Wolf (1976). Concise Amharic Dictionary. (Reissue edition: 1996) Berkeley and Los Angeles: University of California Press.  
 Täsämma Habtä Mikael Gəṣṣəw (1953 Ethiopian calendar). Käsate Bərhan Täsämma. Yä-Amarəñña mäzgäbä qalat. Addis Ababa: Artistic.

External links

 Amharic Keyboard online (and offline too):  type 1 and type 2
 Fonts for Geʽez script:
 Noto Sans Ethiopic (multiple weights and widths)
 Noto Serif Ethiopic (multiple weights and widths)
 Abyssinica SIL (Character set support) 
 Selected Annotated Bibliography on Amharic by Grover Hudson at the Michigan State University website.
 US State Dept. FSI Amharic course

 
Fusional languages
Languages of Ethiopia
South Semitic languages
Transverse Ethiopian Semitic languages